The Tiger of Eschnapur (originally Der Tiger von Eschnapur) is a 1938 German film directed by Richard Eichberg and starring Philip Dorn, La Jana and Theo Lingen. It was followed by a second part The Indian Tomb which was released the same year.

Cast 
Philip Dorn as Maharadscha von Eschnapur
La Jana as Maharani von Eschnapur
Alexander Golling as Prinz Ramigani, Vetter des Maharadscha
Theo Lingen as Emil Sperling
Kitty Jantzen as Irene Traven
Gustav Diessl as Sascha Demidoff, Abenteurer
Hans Stüwe as Peter Fürbringer, Architekt
Karl Haubenreißer as Gopal
Albert Hörrmann as Ragupati, in Diensten Ramiganis
Rosa Jung as Myrrha, Vertraute der Maharani
S.O. Schoening as Leibarzt Dr. Putri
Gisela Schlüter as Lotte Sperling
Hans Zesch-Ballot as Fjedor Borodin, Abenteurer
Harry Frank as Mischa Borodin, Abenteurer
Gerhard Dammann as Neugieriger Gast auf Fürbringers Fest
Hertha von Walther as Gast auf Fürbringers Fest
Carl Auen as Indischer Nobiler
Jutta Jol as Mädchen bei Irene Traven
Theo Shall as Direktor des Crystal Palace
Charles Willy Kayser as Direktor des Crystal Palace
Josef Peterhans as Indischer Nobiler
Paul Rehkopf as Indischer Nobiler

Soundtrack

External links 

1938 films
1938 adventure films
German adventure films
Films of Nazi Germany
1930s German-language films
Films directed by Richard Eichberg
German black-and-white films
Films based on German novels
Films based on works by Thea von Harbou
Sound film remakes of silent films
Remakes of German films
Films set in India
German multilingual films
1938 multilingual films
1930s German films